"Paravany" is a single of the Czech pop music group Slza. The music was created by Petr Lexa, Lukáš Bundil and Oliver Som, English writer. Lyrics was composed by Ondřej Ládek and Petr Lexa. Production of single was made in London with Brity Nick Atkinson and Edd Holloway.

Music video 
A music video was also shot on this single. Director of music video is Jakub Mahdal (from company Jakoby Films).

References

External links 

 Official website of Slza

Slza songs
Universal Music Group singles
Songs written by Xindl X
2019 songs
2019 singles